Molops is a genus of beetles in the family Carabidae, containing the following species:

 Molops albanicus Apfelbeck, 1904
 Molops alpestris Dejean, 1828
 Molops apfelbecki Ganglbauer, 1891
 Molops austriacus Ganglbauer, 1889
 Molops biokovensis J. Muller, 1916
 Molops bosnicus Ganglbauer, 1889
 Molops bucephalus Dejean, 1828
 Molops cephallenicus J. Muller, 1936
 Molops curtulus Ganglbauer, 1891
 Molops dalmatinus Dejean, 1828
 Molops dilatatus Chaudoir, 1868
 Molops dinaricus Apfelbeck, 1904
 Molops doderoi Schatzmayr, 1909
 Molops edurus (Dejean, 1828)
 Molops elatus Fabricius, 1801
 Molops euboeicus Ganglbauer, 1889
 Molops longipennis Dejean, 1828
 Molops malshentianus Apfelbeck, 1918
 Molops marcelloi Bosulini, 1957
 Molops marginepunctatus Dejean, 1831
 Molops matchai Roubal, 19 17
 Molops merditanus Apfelbeck, 1906
 Molops montenegrinus L. Miller, 1866
 Molops obtusangulus Ganglbauer, 1889
 Molops osmanilis Apfelbeck, 1904
 Molops ovipennis Chaudoir, 1847
 Molops parnassicola Kraatz, 1875
 Molops parreyssi Kraatz, 1875
 Molops pentheri Apfelbeck, 1904
 Molops peristericus Apfelbeck, 1901
 Molops piceus Panzer, 1793
 Molops plurisetosus J. Muller, 1918
 Molops prenjus Apfelbeck, 1902
 Molops promissus Heyden, 1875
 Molops reiseri Apfelbeck, 1904
 Molops rhodopensis Apfelbeck, 1904
 Molops robustus (Dejean, 1828)
 Molops rufipes Chaudoir, 1843
 Molops rufus Matits, 1911
 Molops senilis Schaum, 1859
 Molops simplex Chaudoir, 1868
 Molops spartanus (Schaum, 1862)
 Molops striolatus Fabricius, 1801
 Molops thessalicus J. Muller, 1930
 Molops valonensis J. Muller, 1936
 Molops weiratheri J. Muller, 1930
 Molops wiedemanni Chaudoir, 1850
 Molops winkleri Breit, 1914

References

External links
Molops at Fauna Europaea

Pterostichinae
Taxa named by Franco Andrea Bonelli